The Virginian Golf Club, designed by Tom Fazio and opened in 1992, is a luxury golf community located in Bristol, Virginia. It features an 18-hole golf course along with a golf club house, and a swimming and racquet club.

External links
The Virginian web site

Bristol, Virginia
Golf clubs and courses in Virginia